Charlotte Irene Caffey (born October 21, 1953) is an American guitarist, best known for her work in the rock band the Go-Go's in the 1980s, including writing "We Got the Beat".

Career
Caffey began her musical career playing bass guitar in the early Los Angeles punk band The Eyes before joining the Go-Go's in 1978 and switching to guitar. She remained friends with fellow band member Belinda Carlisle after the initial breakup of the Go-Go's and wrote songs for Carlisle's solo albums.

From 1988 until 1992, she led her own band, The Graces, with Meredith Brooks and Gia Ciambotti, who released the album Perfect View in 1989. Caffey also co-wrote the theme song to the television series Clueless with Anna Waronker, and played piano on the album version of "Foolish Games" by Jewel, as well as co-writing the No. 1 U.S. country hit "But for the Grace of God" with Keith Urban.

Caffey wrote the book, music, and lyrics for Lovelace: A Rock Musical with Anna Waronker.  The rock musical debuted at the Hayworth Theatre in Los Angeles in 2008.  A new production of Lovelace: A Rock Musical made its United Kingdom debut at the Edinburgh Festival Fringe in August 2010.  A number of her songs were featured in the 2018 debut of the Broadway musical Head Over Heels, with a story suggested by Philip Sidney's Arcadia set to the songs of the Go-Go's and Belinda Carlisle.

The Go-Go's announced an 11-date reunion tour scheduled to begin in June 2020; however, in May 2020 the tour was postponed due to the COVID-19 pandemic. In May 2021 it was announced that The Go-Go's would be inducted into the Rock and Roll Hall of Fame.
The band confirmed plans for a 2022 UK tour with Billy Idol that would start in June 2022. The band was forced to postpone a short West Coast tour scheduled for the first week of January 2022 due to a COVID-19 case involving someone on the tour. New rescheduled dates for the shows would be announced very soon.

Personal life
She grew up in Glendale, California, and graduated from Immaculate Heart College. She is also in Ze Malibu Kids with her husband, the Redd Kross singer and guitarist Jeff McDonald. Their only child, a daughter named Astrid McDonald, was born in 1995 and is a singer and model.

She was the fourth of twelve children born to Ann (née Gorey) and Michael Caffey (died 2017), an American network television series episode director from the mid-1960s on into the 1990s (The Virginian, Dukes of Hazzard, Barnaby Jones, MacGyver, CHiPs, T.J. Hooker).

Charlotte semi-retired from regular performances in the late 1980s because of crippling carpal tunnel syndrome.

Discography

With The Go-Go's
 1981: Beauty and the Beat (IRS)
 1982: Vacation (I.R.S.)
 1984: Talk Show (I.R.S.)
 2001: God Bless The Go-Go's (Beyond Music)

With The Graces
 1989: Perfect View (A&M)

Also appears on
 1980: The Specials – More Specials (2 Tone) – backing vocals
 1982: Robert Williams – Late One Night (A&M) – vocals on track 8, "Gotta Be Nice"
 1986: Belinda Carlisle – Belinda (I.R.S.) – vocals, guitar
 1988: Blake Xolton – Cool on My Skin (New Rose) – vocals
 1995: Jewel – Pieces of You (Atlantic) – arranger, piano
 1998: Penelope Houston – Tongue (Reprise) – guitar, vocals on track 2, "Tongue"

References

External links
The Go-Go's official website
 
 
Lovelace: A Rock Musical

1953 births
Living people
Musicians from Glendale, California
Immaculate Heart College alumni
American rock guitarists
Singer-songwriters from California
Writers from Glendale, California
The Go-Go's members
Lead guitarists
American new wave musicians
American women singer-songwriters
American rock songwriters
American women rock singers
American women pop singers
Guitarists from California
Alumni of Immaculate Heart High School, Los Angeles
20th-century American women singers
20th-century American women guitarists
20th-century American guitarists
21st-century American women guitarists
21st-century American guitarists
21st-century American women singers
Germs (band) members
The Graces (band) members
20th-century American singers
Women in punk